Jilleanne Rookard (born January 9, 1983 in Wyandotte, Michigan) is a former speed skater who has competed since 2006. She was named to the U.S. team for the 2010 Winter Olympics. She reached the 12th place in the 3000m in a time of 4:13.05 and 8th place in the 5000m with a time of 7:07.48. She now plays Roller Derby with the Detroit Derby Girls.

Olympic Trials

On December 27, 2013, Rookard won the 3,000-meter women's speedskating event at the Olympic Trials in Salt Lake City, Utah to earn a spot on the U.S. Olympic team competing in Sochi in February.

References

External links
NBCOlympics.com profile

1983 births
American female speed skaters
Living people
Olympic speed skaters of the United States
Speed skaters at the 2010 Winter Olympics
Speed skaters at the 2014 Winter Olympics
21st-century American women